The 2001 Gelsor Open Romania was a men'a tennis tournament played on outdoor clay courts at the Arenele BNR in Bucharest, Romania and was part of the International Series of the 2001 ATP Tour. The tournament ran from 10 September through 16 September 2001. Seventh-seeded Younes El Aynaoui won the singles title.

Finals

Singles

 Younes El Aynaoui defeated  Albert Montañés 7–6(7–5), 7–6(7–2)
 It was El Aynaoui's only title of the year and the 2nd of his career.

Doubles

 Aleksandar Kitinov /  Johan Landsberg defeated  Pablo Albano /  Marc-Kevin Goellner 6–4, 6–7(5–7), [10–6]
 It was Kitinov's only title of the year and the 3rd of his career. It was Landsberg's only title of the year and the 2nd of his career.

References

External links
 Official website 
 ATP tournament profile

Gelsor Open Romania
Romanian Open
2001 in Romanian tennis
September 2001 sports events in Europe